Youth is an unincorporated community in Walton County, in the U.S. state of Georgia.

History
A post office called Youth was established in 1895, and remained in operation until 1900. The name Youth was "wistfully" applied to this community.

Education
Public education in Youth is administered by Walton County School District. The district operates Youth Elementary School.

References

Unincorporated communities in Georgia (U.S. state)
Unincorporated communities in Walton County, Georgia